SORT or Statistics and Operations Research Transactions is a peer-reviewed open access scientific journal that publishes papers related to statistics. It is published by the Institut d'Estadística de Catalunya, the statistical office of Catalonia, in English with a brief summary in Catalan.

The journal was established in 2003, when it replaced the journal Qüestiió (Quaderns d'Estadística i Investigació Operativa, 1977-2002). It publishes two issues each year, and is available online as open access.

Abstracting and indexing
SORT is indexed in the Current Index to Statistics, Science Citation Index Expanded, and Journal Citation Reports.

External links
 

Publications established in 1977
Open access journals
Statistics journals
Biannual journals
English-language journals